Stipple is a defunct company founded in 2010 that provided a platform for the tagging of people, places, and objects inside of images.

History
Co-founder and CEO Rey Flemings launched Stipple in August 2010, when the company released its first public offering. Seed funding amounting to $2 million was secured from people and companies including Kleiner Perkins Caufield & Byers, Floodgate Ventures, Justin Timberlake, Eghosa Omoigui, Quest Ventures, Naval Ravikant, Matt Mullenweg, and Rick Marini.

In 2011, Stipple launched Stipple Lens, which allows photo agencies to earn money from images they upload to Stipple. Stipple Pipeline allows brands to tag their products in photos uploaded to Stipple. Through Stipple Network, the photos are open to use by website publishers, who are paid by companies with products in the photos. Consumers can then click on the products tagged and buy them. As of May 2011, Stipple had contracts with nine photo agencies, 50 brands, and 1,300 publishers.

On September 20, 2011, Stipple launched Stipple Marketplace, a product that allows advertising to be delivered via images. Gigaom said Marketplace is an alternative to the expensive practice of obtaining images from stock photo agencies.

Stipple was acquired by an undisclosed firm in a private transaction and the product was eventually shuttered.

Stipple
The Stipple platform facilitates the tagging of products and people in images. Stipple tags appear when a user's cursor enters the frame of the image. Publishers enable Stipple by adding JavaScript code to their websites. Tagged items from one image automatically propagate to other images in Stipple's network with the same item.

TechCrunch called Stipple "AdWords For Images".

References

External links
 Official site

Internet technology companies of the United States
Internet properties established in 2009
Companies based in San Francisco